KWDD (94.3 FM, "Wild 94.3") is a commercial radio station in Fairbanks, Alaska. KWDD debuted on November 4, 2012, playing a country music format.

References

External links
 Official Website
 

2012 establishments in Alaska
Country radio stations in the United States
Radio stations established in 2012
WDD